John Napier Wyndham Turner  (June 7, 1929September 19, 2020) was a Canadian lawyer and politician who served as the 17th prime minister of Canada from June to September 1984. He served as leader of the Liberal Party of Canada and leader of the Official Opposition from 1984 to 1990.

Turner practised law before being elected as a member of Parliament in the 1962 federal election. He served in the cabinet of Prime Minister Pierre Trudeau as minister of justice and attorney general from 1968 to 1972, and minister of finance from 1972 to 1975. As a cabinet minister, Turner came to be known as a leader of the Business Liberal faction of the Liberal Party. Amid a global recession and the prospect of having to implement unpopular wage and price controls, Turner resigned from his position in 1975.

From 1975 to 1984, Turner took a hiatus from politics, working as a corporate lawyer on Bay Street. Trudeau's resignation in 1984 triggered a leadership election, in which Turner successfully contested. Turner held the office of prime minister for just 79 days, as he advised the governor general to dissolve Parliament immediately after being sworn in. He went on to lose the 1984 election in a landslide to Brian Mulroney's Progressive Conservatives, leading the Liberals to the second-worst defeat for a governing party at the federal level (in terms of proportion of seats). Turner stayed on as Liberal leader and led the Opposition for the next six years. In the 1988 election, he vigorously campaigned against Mulroney's proposed free trade agreement with the United States, and led the Liberals to a modest recovery. Turner resigned as party leader in 1990 and did not seek re-election in 1993.

Turner was Canada's first prime minister born in the United Kingdom since Mackenzie Bowell in 1896, Canada's second shortest-serving prime minister behind Charles Tupper, and Canada's fourth longest-lived prime minister, living to the age of 91.

Early life
Turner was born on June 7, 1929, in Richmond, Surrey, England (now a part of London), to Leonard Hugh Turner, an English journalist, and Phyllis Gregory, a Canadian economist. He had a brother, Michael, born in 1930 (who died shortly after birth), and a sister, Brenda, born in 1931. When Turner's father died in 1932, he and his sister moved to Canada with their Canadian-born mother. The family settled in her childhood home in Rossland, British Columbia, and later moved to Ottawa.

Turner's mother was loving but demanding of her two children. The family was not wealthy. His mother remarried in 1945 to Frank Mackenzie Ross, who later served as Lieutenant Governor of British Columbia, and the family relocated to Vancouver.

Education
Turner was educated at Ashbury College and St Patrick's College, Ottawa (senior matriculation). He enrolled at the University of British Columbia (UBC) in 1945 at age 16 where he was a member of the UBC chapter of the Beta Theta Pi fraternity, and was among Canada's outstanding track sprinters in the late 1940s. He held the Canadian record for the men's 100-yard dash and qualified for the 1948 London Olympics, but a bad knee kept him from competing. He graduated from UBC with a BA (Honours) in 1949.

Awarded a Rhodes Scholarship, Turner went on to Magdalen College at the University of Oxford, where he earned a BA, Jurisprudence, 1951; a Bachelor of Civil Law, 1952; and an MA, 1957. He was on the track and field team at Oxford. One of his teammates was Roger Bannister, who became the first runner to break the four-minute barrier in the mile. At Oxford, Turner was a classmate and friend of future Australian Prime Ministers Malcolm Fraser and Bob Hawke, as well as Jeremy Thorpe, future leader of Britain's Liberal Party. He also pursued doctoral studies at the University of Paris from 1952 to 1953.

Relationship with Princess Margaret
On May 19, 1959, at a party hosted by his stepfather, as Lieutenant Governor, to celebrate the opening of the new British Columbia Government House, Turner danced with Princess Margaret, one year his junior. This was the first time that Turner received significant press attention in Canada; there was considerable speculation about whether the two would become a serious couple. According to letters by Margaret obtained by the Daily Mail, the relationship was more serious than previously thought with the princess writing in one letter, seven years later, that she "nearly married him". According to contemporary press reports, the relationship caused serious consternation at Buckingham Palace as Turner was a Roman Catholic, and Margaret would have had to forfeit her place in the line of succession to the British throne to marry him.

Brenda confirmed a "very definite attraction" between her brother and the princess, but said that Turner was uninterested in royalty and would not have given up Catholicism. After meeting Margaret again during her Canadian tour, Turner attended her party at Balmoral Castle in August 1959 where his roommate was Margaret's future husband Antony Armstrong-Jones, and was the only Canadian unofficial guest at their wedding in May 1960. Turner remained friends with Margaret, he and his wife often meeting the princess in Britain or during official visits to Canada. They attended Margaret's 2002 private funeral and were Canada's official representatives at the memorial service.

Marriage and family
Turner was married on May 11, 1963, to Geills McCrae Kilgour (b. 1937) who was then a systems engineer with IBM, and the great niece of Canadian Army doctor John McCrae, the author of what is probably the best-known First World War poem, "In Flanders Fields", and sister of David Kilgour, a long-time Canadian Member of Parliament. The Turners have a daughter named Elizabeth and two sons: Michael and Andrew. Their second son, David, died in 2021. The Turner children attended Rockcliffe Park Public School, in Ottawa. All three sons attended Upper Canada College, in Toronto.

Early career
Turner practised law, initially with the firm of Stikeman Elliott in Montreal, Quebec. He was elected as Member of Parliament for St. Lawrence—St. George in 1962 and was reelected there in every election until the riding's dissolution in 1968. He was the Member of Parliament for Ottawa—Carleton from 1968 to 1976.

In 1965, while vacationing in Barbados, Turner noticed that former prime minister and Leader of the Opposition John Diefenbaker, staying at the same hotel, was struggling in the strong surf and undertow. Turner, a competitive swimmer while in university, jumped in and pulled Diefenbaker to shore.

Cabinet minister

Premiership of Lester Pearson
Turner was generally respected for his work as a cabinet minister in the 1960s and 1970s, under prime ministers Lester Pearson and Pierre Trudeau.

He served in the Cabinet of Prime Minister Lester Pearson in various capacities, most notably as Minister of Consumer and Corporate Affairs. When Pearson retired, Turner ran to succeed him at the 1968 leadership convention. Turner, at age 38 the youngest of the dozen leadership candidates, stated "My time is now", and remarked during his speech that he was "not here for some vague, future convention in, say, 1984". Turner stayed on until the fourth and final ballot, finishing third behind Pierre Trudeau and runner-up Robert Winters.

Premiership of Pierre Trudeau
 Turner served in Trudeau's cabinet as minister of justice for four years. Biographer Paul Litt argues that Turner was a hard-working, well-informed minister whose success was assured by his warm relationship with his peers. His achievements, say Litt, included strengthening the rights of individual defendants on trial, greater efficiency in the justice system, creation of the influential Law Reform Commission, selecting highly professional judges, and bringing a policy perspective to the Justice Department. He led the government's position in the highly controversial Official Languages Act, and he took control during the October Crisis in 1970.

A leader of the Business Liberal faction of the Liberal Party, Turner then served as Minister of Finance from 1972 until 1975. His challenges were severe in the face of global financial issues such as the 1973 oil crisis, the collapse of the postwar Bretton Woods trading system, slowing economic growth combined with soaring inflation (stagflation), and growing deficits. His positions were more conservative than Trudeau's and they drew apart. In 1975 Turner surprisingly resigned from cabinet. The Liberals had won the 1974 election by attacking Robert Stanfield's Progressive Conservatives over their platform involving wage and price controls. However, Trudeau decided to implement the wage and price controls in late 1975, so some have suggested that Turner quit rather than carry out that proposal. In a 2013 interview with Catherine Clark on CPAC Turner confirmed his resignation from cabinet was a direct result of refusing to implement wage and price controls, after campaigning against them in 1974.

In his memoirs, Trudeau wrote that Turner said he resigned as Finance Minister in 1975 because he was tired of politics, after 13 years in Ottawa, and wanted to move on to a better-paying job as a lawyer in Toronto, to better support his family and to be with them more, as his children were growing up. Trudeau also suggested that Turner's years as finance minister were very difficult because of turbulent and unusual conditions in the world economy, characterized as stagflation, largely caused by enormous increases in the price of oil.

Bay Street
From 1975 to 1984, Turner worked as a corporate lawyer at the Bay Street law firm McMillan Binch. When Pierre Trudeau resigned as Liberal leader in 1979 following an election loss, Turner announced that he would not be a candidate for the Liberal leadership. Trudeau was talked into rescinding his resignation after the government of Joe Clark was defeated by a motion of no confidence, and returned to contest and win the 1980 federal election. Trudeau then served as Prime Minister until 1984.

Prime minister (June–September 1984)
Trudeau retired after polls showed the Liberals faced certain defeat in the next election if he remained in office. Turner then re-entered politics, and defeated Jean Chrétien, his successor as finance minister, on the second ballot of the June 1984 Liberal leadership convention. He was formally appointed prime minister on June 30. When he was sworn in, Turner was not an MP or senator. Had he wished to have parliament summoned, he would not have been able to appear on the floor of the House of Commons. He also announced that he would not run in a by-election to get into the Commons, but would instead run in the next general election as the Liberal candidate in the British Columbia riding of Vancouver Quadra. This was a sharp departure from usual practice, in which the incumbent in a safe seat resigns to allow a newly elected party leader a chance to get into parliament, and the seat Turner intended to contest was held by the Tories instead. However, this was part of Turner's strategy to rebuild the Liberals' image in western Canada; at the time, the party held no seats west of Winnipeg.

In his final days of office, Trudeau recommended that Governor General Jeanne Sauvé appoint over 200 Liberals to patronage positions, including senators, judges, and executives on various governmental and crown corporation boards. The large number of appointments, as well as doubtful qualifications of some appointees, generated a severe backlash across the political spectrum. Turner then made a further 70 appointments himself, one of Trudeau's conditions for retiring earlier than he had planned.

1984 federal election

On July 9, only nine days after being sworn in, Turner asked Sauvé to dissolve parliament and advised her to call an election for early September. Turner was persuaded by internal polls that showed the Liberals were ahead of the Tories; after Turner won the leadership his party surged in the polls to take a lead, after trailing by more than 20 percentage points before he was selected. Progressive Conservative leader Brian Mulroney and other experts had expected Turner to tour Canada during the summer and early autumn, accompanying Queen Elizabeth II and Pope John Paul II on their upcoming visits, and then call the election for later in the autumn. However, the Liberals' polling data was faulty; they had in fact not polled since May and the situation had since changed, not least because of the public uproar over the patronage appointments. As the campaign unfolded, the Tories and Mulroney, who was fighting his first general election in any capacity, soon took the lead.

Early in the campaign, Turner appeared rusty and old-fashioned. His policies contrasted with Trudeau's and seemed to legitimize the Tory calls for lowering the deficit, improving relations with the United States, cutting the bureaucracy, and promoting more federal-provincial harmony. He spoke of creating "make work projects", a discarded phrase from the 1970s that had been replaced by the less patronizing "job creation programs". Turner was also caught on television patting the bottoms of Liberal Party President Iona Campagnolo and Vice-President Lise St. Martin-Tremblay, causing an uproar among feminists, who saw such behaviour as sexist and condescending.

During the televised leaders' debate, Turner attacked Mulroney over the patronage machine that the latter had allegedly set up in anticipation of victory, comparing it to the Union Nationale governments of Quebec. Mulroney responded by pointing to the raft of patronage appointments made on the advice of Trudeau and Turner. Turner had the right to advise Sauvé to cancel Trudeau's appointments—advice that she was bound to follow by convention—but failed to do so and added to his own. Mulroney demanded that Turner apologize to the country for what he called "these horrible appointments." Turner claimed that "I had no option" except to let them stand. Mulroney responded, "You had an option, sirto say 'no'and you chose to say 'yes' to the old attitudes and the old stories of the Liberal Party." He highlighted the Liberals' long record in government and resulting patronage appointments. Many observers believed that Mulroney clinched the election at this point, as it made Turner look weak and indecisive. Analysts agreed he was "done in by television."

Turner discovered late in the campaign that the Liberals' electoral hopes were poor in their traditional stronghold of Quebec. The party had heretofore relied on Trudeau's appeal, patronage, and traditional dislike of the Progressive Conservatives for victory in recent previous elections. Turner had surrounded himself with Trudeau's factional opponents and Trudeau himself did not endorse Turner. In a last-minute turnaround, Turner rehired much of Trudeau's staff during the final weeks, but this had little effect. Quebec's disaffection with the federal Liberals regarding patriation in 1982 further contributed to their defeat. Mulroney, a native Quebecker, was able to harness that discontent to the Progressive Conservatives' advantage by promising a new constitutional agreement.

On September 4, the Liberals were swept from power in a Tory landslide. The Liberals were cut down to 40 seats, the fewest in the party's history until 2011, against 211 for the Progressive Conservatives. The Liberals fell to 17 seats in Quebec, all but four in and around Montreal. Eleven members of Turner's cabinet were defeated. It was the worst defeat the Liberals experienced in a federal election since 1958.

Turner stepped down as prime minister on September 17. The election having been called just over a week after his being sworn in, Turner held the office of prime minister for two months and seventeen days, the second-shortest stint in Canadian history, ahead of only Sir Charles Tupper, who took office after dissolution of parliament. Turner, along with Tupper and later Kim Campbell, were the only PMs who never faced a parliament or implemented any legislative initiative.

Leader of the Opposition
In 1984, Turner managed to defeat the Tory incumbent in Vancouver Quadra, Bill Clarke by 3,200 votes, a surprising result given the size of the Tory wave, and became leader of the opposition. He was the only Liberal MP from British Columbia, and one of only two from west of Ontario. The Liberals, amid their worst showing in party history and led by an unpopular Turner, were said by some pundits to be following the British Liberals into oblivion. Though the Liberals had not fared much better in the 1958 election, they had clearly emerged as the main opposition party back then. After the 1984 election, however, the NDP were not far behind with 30 seats. Their leader Ed Broadbent consistently outpolled Turner and even Mulroney, except in Quebec.

The Liberals responded by using their large Senate majority, built up over years of Liberal majorities in the Commons, to stall Mulroney's legislation. In addition, a group of young Liberal MPs, known as the "Rat Pack", pestered Mulroney at every turn. The group included Sheila Copps, Brian Tobin, Don Boudria, and John Nunziata.

Turner's leadership was frequently questioned, and in the lead up to the 1986 Liberal convention, a vote of confidence loomed large. The popular Jean Chrétien resigned his seat, creating a stir in caucus. Keith Davey publicly voiced his concerns with Turner's leadership, which coincided with backroom struggles involving Chrétien's supporters. The public conflict is said to have influenced many Liberals to support Turner, and he ended up getting a little over 75% of the delegate vote.
The Liberals faced more internal conflict in the next few years, but polls frequently had them in front of the Progressive Conservatives (however, with Turner last in preferred prime minister categories). The upcoming Canada–US Free Trade Agreement (FTA) and Meech Lake Accord threatened to divide the party until Turner took the position of being pro-Meech Lake and against the FTA. Turner asked the Liberal Senators to hold off on passing the legislation to implement the agreement until an election was held. It was later revealed that Mulroney planned to have an election called, anyway.

1988 federal election

When the election was called for November 21, 1988, the Liberals had some early struggles, notably during one day in Montreal where 3 different costs were given for the proposed Liberal daycare program. The campaign was also hampered by a Canadian Broadcasting Corporation report that stated there was a movement in the backroom to replace Turner with Chrétien.

Turner campaigned rallying support against the proposed FTA, an agreement that he said would lead to the abandonment of Canada's political sovereignty to the United States. His performance in the debate and his attacks on Mulroney and the FTA, where he accused the Progressive Conservative Prime Minister of selling Canada out with one signature of a pen, raised his poll numbers, and soon the Liberals were hoping for a majority. This prompted the Progressive Conservatives to stop the relatively calm campaign they had been running, and go with Allan Gregg's suggestion of "bombing the bridge" that joined anti-FTA voters and the Liberals; Turner's backbone. The ads focused on Turner's leadership struggles, and combined with over $6 million in pro-FTA ads, stopped Turner's momentum. Also not helping the Liberals was that the NDP had opposed the FTA as well (though not as vocally); this likely resulted in vote-splitting between the opposition parties. Although most Canadians voted for parties opposed to free trade, the Tories were returned with a majority government, and implemented the deal.

The Liberals more than doubled their representation to 83 seats, and kept their role as the Official Opposition; the NDP had also made gains but finished a distant third with 43 seats. The Progressive Conservatives won a reduced majority government with 169 seats.

The election loss seemed to confirm Turner's fate; he announced he was standing down from the party leadership in May 1989, officially resigning in June 1990. Turner resigned as Official Opposition leader, while still holding the Liberal leadership, so Herb Gray became the caucus leader in the interim. Chrétien won that year's leadership convention over Paul Martin. Although not officially endorsed by Turner himself, Martin was widely the favourite of Turner's supporters.

Turner continued to represent Vancouver Quadra in the House of Commons before retiring from politics in the 1993 election.

After politics

Turner voiced his support for the Campaign for the Establishment of a United Nations Parliamentary Assembly, an organisation which campaigns for democratic reformation of the United Nations, and the creation of a more accountable international political system.

In 2017, he was awarded the Gold Medal of the Royal Canadian Geographical Society. Turner lived in the Deer Park neighbourhood of Toronto.

Death and state funeral 

Turner died on September 19, 2020, at the age of 91. A state funeral was held for Turner on October 6, 2020, at St. Michael's Cathedral Basilica. Turner was buried in a private service at Mount Pleasant Cemetery. Turner and Mackenzie King are two former Prime Ministers interred at Mount Pleasant.

Honours
100px

100px

According to Canadian protocol, as a former prime minister, he was styled The Right Honourable for life.

Turner was ranked 18th out of the first 20 Prime Ministers of Canada (through Jean Chrétien) by a survey of Canadian historians in 1999. The survey was used in the book Prime Ministers: Ranking Canada's Leaders by J. L. Granatstein and Norman Hillmer.

Turner was appointed a Companion of the Order of Canada on October 19, 1994, and was invested on May 3, 1995. His citation reads: He became Canada's seventeenth Prime Minister, crowning a distinguished parliamentary career during which he held several key Cabinet portfolios. Parallel to his political life, he has been a respected member of the law profession and supporter of many charitable organizations, in particular Mount Sinai Hospital and the Community Foundation of Toronto. His passion for his country is admired by all Canadians.

Honorary degrees

See also

List of prime ministers of Canada

Federal budget presented as minister of finance
1973 Canadian federal budget
May 1974 Canadian federal budget
November 1974 Canadian federal budget
1975 Canadian federal budget

References

Further reading

Archives

Bibliography

External links

University of British Columbia Sports Hall of Fame
CBC Digital Archives – The Long Run: The Political Rise of John Turner

Prime Ministers of Canada
Leaders of the Liberal Party of Canada
Canadian Ministers of Finance
Members of the 19th Canadian Ministry
Members of the 20th Canadian Ministry
Members of the 23rd Canadian Ministry
Members of the House of Commons of Canada from British Columbia
Members of the King's Privy Council for Canada
Lawyers in Ontario
Canadian lawyers
Canadian King's Counsel
Canadian Rhodes Scholars
Canadian male sprinters
Sportspeople from British Columbia
University of British Columbia alumni
Alumni of Magdalen College, Oxford
University of Paris alumni
People from Richmond, London
Politicians from Victoria, British Columbia
Politicians from Vancouver
Politicians from Toronto
Companions of the Order of Canada
1929 births
2020 deaths
Leaders of the Opposition (Canada)
English emigrants to Canada
Canadian corporate directors
Canadian Roman Catholics
English Roman Catholics
Corporate lawyers
Solicitors General of Canada
English people of Canadian descent
21st-century Canadian politicians
Burials at Mount Pleasant Cemetery, Toronto